Kertapati Station (KPT) is a railway station located in Kemas Rindo, Kertapati, Palembang, South Sumatra, Indonesia. It is operated the Regional Division III Palembang of Kereta Api Indonesia, and become the main station of the city. The station is close to the Musi River and Ogan River.

Services
The following is a list of train services at the Kertapati Station

Passenger services
 Commuter
 Kertalaya to Indralaya
 Economy class
 Serelo to Lubuklinggau
 Rajabasa to Tanjung Karang
 Mixed class
 Sindang Marga to Lubuklinggau
 Sriwijaya to Tanjung Karang

Freight
 Coal to Sukacinta
 Petroleum to Lubuklinggau, Lahat and Tigagajah

References

External links
 

Palembang
Railway stations in South Sumatra
railway stations opened in 1915